The 2021 Dawn Ultra 150 was the seventh stock car race of the 2021 ARCA Menards Series season, the second race of the 2021 Sioux Chief Showdown, and the second iteration of the event. The race was held on Friday, June 4, in Lexington, Ohio at the Mid-Ohio Sports Car Course, a  permanent road course. The race took the scheduled 42 laps to complete. At race's end, Ty Gibbs would dominate for his 13th ARCA Menards Series career win, his fifth of the season, and the fourth of the season. To fill out the podium, Austin Hill of Hattori Racing Enterprises and Thad Moffitt of David Gilliland Racing would finish second and third, respectively.

Background 

The track is a road course auto racing facility located in Troy Township, Morrow County, Ohio, United States, just outside the village of Lexington. Mid-Ohio has also colloquially become a term for the entire north-central region of the state, from south of Sandusky to the north of Columbus.

The track opened as a 15-turn, 2.4 mile (3.86 km) road circuit run clockwise. The back portion of the track allows speeds approaching 180 mph (290 km/h). A separate starting line is located on the backstretch to allow for safer rolling starts. The regular start / finish line is located on the pit straight. There is grandstand seating for 10,000 spectators and three observation mounds alongside the track raise the capacity to over 75,000.

Entry list

Qualifying 
Qualifying would take place on Friday, June 4, at 2:45 PM EST. The qualifying system was a 45 minute session where drivers could run as many laps as they wanted within the session to set a time.

Full qualifying results

Race results

References 

2021 ARCA Menards Series
Dawn 150
Dawn 150